In the United States, trolley parks, which started in the 19th century, were picnic and recreation areas along or at the ends of streetcar lines in most of the larger cities. These were precursors to amusement parks. Trolley parks were often created by the streetcar companies to give people a reason to use their services on weekends.

The parks originally consisted of picnic groves and pavilions, and often held events such as dances, concerts and fireworks. Many eventually added features such as swimming pools, carousels, Ferris wheels, roller coasters, sports fields, boats rides, restaurants and other resort facilities to become amusement parks. Various sources report the existence of between 1,500 and 2,000 amusement parks in the United States by 1919.

Coney Island
One such location was Coney Island in Brooklyn, New York, where a horse-drawn street car line brought pleasure seekers to the beach beginning in 1829. In 1875, a million passengers rode the Coney Island Railroad, and in 1876 two million reached Coney Island. Hotels and amusements were built to accommodate both the upper-classes and the working-class. The first carousel was installed in the 1870s, the first Switchback Railway in 1881. It wasn't until 1895 that the first permanent amusement park in North America opened: Sea Lion Park at Coney Island. This park was one of the first to charge admission for entrance to the park in addition to selling tickets for rides within the park.

In 1897, it was joined by Steeplechase Park, the first of three major amusement parks that would open in the area. George Tilyou designed the park to provide thrills and sweep away the restraints of the Victorian crowds. The combination of the nearby population center of New York City and the ease of access to the area made Coney Island the embodiment of the American amusement park. In addition there was Luna Park (opened in 1903) and Dreamland (opened in 1904). Coney Island was a huge success, and by 1910 attendance on a Sunday could reach a million people.

Trolley parks decline

By the early 20th century, there were hundreds of amusement parks, many of them starting as trolley parks, in operation around the USA. Every major city boasted one or more parks, often based on (or named) Coney Island, Luna Park, or Dreamland. This began the era of the “golden age” of amusement parks that reigned until the late 1920s. This was an era when the number of hours worked was reduced, while the amount of disposable income rose. The amusement parks reflected the mechanization and efficiency of industrialization, while serving as a source of fantasy and escape from real life.

With the increasing number of automobiles in use, attendance at urban trolley parks gradually declined, due to lack of parking and changing demographics in the urban areas. Although the automobile provided people with more options for satisfying their entertainment needs, amusement parks that were accessible by car continued to be successful and new parks were developed. By the end of the 1920s, amusement parks were to suffer steep declines for various reasons, particularly the Great Depression.

List of trolley parks still operating

List of trolley parks now closed

 Al Fresco Amusement Park, Peoria, Illinois
 Bay Shore Park, Edgemere, Maryland (Baltimore County), Maryland (near Baltimore, Maryland, 1906–1947; some structures remain in North Point State Park.)
 Big Island Amusement Park, Minneapolis, Minnesota (1906–1911)
 Bonnie Brae Park, Phoenixville, Pennsylvania
 Brandywine Springs Amusement Park, Newport, Delaware (1886–1923)
 Burnham Park, Burnham, Pennsylvania (ca 1903 to 1916, relocated to Kishacoquillas Park)
 Cascade Park, New Castle, Pennsylvania. (Originally opened as Brinton Park in 1891. Cascade Park opened in 1897. While the rides are gone, the park remains as a site for community events.)
 Chevy Chase Lake, Chevy Chase, Maryland
 C&ST Trolley Park Blue Island, IL (1911–1914)  The site is now owned by the Cook County (IL) Forest Preserve District in use as a picnic grove.
 Chutes Park, Los Angeles, California (1887–1914)
 Contoocook River Amusement Park, Penacook, New Hampshire (1893–1925)
 Council Crest Amusement Park, Portland, Oregon (1907–1929)
 Crescent Park, Riverside, Rhode Island
 Dellwood Park, Lockport, Illinois, founded by the Chicago and Joliet Electric Railway
 Dixieland Amusement Park, South Jacksonville (Jacksonville), Florida. (South Jacksonville Municipal Railways; destroyed in a hail storm.)
 Dominion Park, Montreal, Canada (1906–1937; Montreal Suburban Tramway and Power company, precursor to today's publicly owned transit commission.)
 Eldora Park, Eldora, Pennsylvania, (Carroll Township, Washington County), (1901–mid-1940s)
 Electric Park, Detroit (1906–1928)
 Electric Park, Niverville, New York (1901–1917; Albany and Hudson Railroad; “largest amusement park on the east coast between Manhattan and Montreal”)
 Euclid Beach Park, Euclid, Ohio, then Cleveland, Ohio (1895—1969): When first opened, visitors came to the park on two steamers from downtown Cleveland. When the Humphrey Family took over direction of the park they agreed to discontinue boat service in return for one street car fare charge to the park from the provider. Initially a street car stop was built inside the park. (Euclid Beach Park, is Closed for the Season, 1977)
 Excelsior Amusement Park, Excelsior, Minnesota (1925–1973)
 Fleishhacker Pool and Zoo, San Francisco, California (1925–1971)
 Fontaine Ferry Park, Louisville, Kentucky (1905–1975)
 Forest Hill Park, Richmond, Virginia (1889–1932)
 Forest Park, Ballston Lake, New York (1902–1927; operated by the Saratoga and Schenectady Railroad)
 Forest Park, Genoa, Ohio
 Fort George Amusement Park, Manhattan, New York
 Glen Park, west of Watertown, New York, Glen Park, New York
 Glen Echo Park, Glen Echo, Maryland (early 1900s–1968)
 Golden Spur Amusement Park, Niantic, Connecticut (operated by New London and East Lyme Street Railway)
 Great Falls Park, Great Falls, Virginia (operated by Washington and Old Dominion Railway)
 Highland Park, York, Pennsylvania (1891–1921) 
 Idora Park, Oakland, California (1904–1929)
 Idora Park, Youngstown, Ohio (1899–1984)
 Indian Park, Montoursville, Pennsylvania (The park remains as a site for community events.)
 Indianola Park, Columbus, Ohio (1905–1937)
 Kaydeross Park Saratoga Springs, New York, (operated by the Delaware and Hudson Railway)
 Kishacoquillas Park, between Burnham, Pennsylvania and Lewistown, Pennsylvania (relocated from Burnham Park in 1916; property and some structures survive as community park.)
 Lake Lansing Amusement Park, Haslett, Michigan (demolished 1972)
 Lake View Park, Sheboygan, Wisconsin
 Lakeview Park (Lake Nipmuc Amusement Park), Mendon, Massachusetts
 Lakewood Amusement, Atlanta, Georgia (1906–1985)
 Lexington Park, Lexington, Massachusetts (1902–1920)
 Lincoln Park, Dartmouth, Massachusetts (1894–1987)
 Lincoln Park, Hallville, Connecticut (operated by Norwich and Westerly Railway)
 Luna Park, Alexandria County (now Arlington County), Virginia (near Washington, D.C., 1906–1915)
 Luna Park, Charleston, West Virginia (1912–1923)
 Luna Park, Cleveland, Ohio (1905–1929)
 Luna Park, Pittsburgh, Pennsylvania (1905–1909)
 Luna Park, Scranton, Pennsylvania (1906–1916)
 Manawa Park, Council Bluffs, Iowa (closed in 1928)
 Merrimack Park, Methuen, Massachusetts (1921–1938)  
 Minerva Park, Minerva Park, Ohio (1895–1902)
 Mountain Park, Holyoke, Massachusetts (1897–1987)
 Mount Holly Park, Mount Holly Springs, Pennsylvania (1901–1930)
 Neptune Beach, Alameda, California (1917–1939)
 Norumbega Park, Newton, Massachusetts (1897–1963)
 Oakland Park, Rockport, Maine (1902–?)
 Ocean View Park, Norfolk, Virginia (1879–1979)
 Olentangy Park, Columbus, Ohio (1880–1937)
 Olympic Park, Irvington/Maplewood, New Jersey
 Ondawa Park Greenwich, New York (operated by the Delaware and Hudson Railway).
 Palisades Amusement Park, Cliffside Park, New Jersey and Fort Lee, New Jersey, (1898–1971)
 Paxtang Park, Harrisburg, Pennsylvania
 Pine Island Park, Manchester, New Hampshire
 Piney Ridge Park, Broad Brook, Connecticut (located on a branch of the Hartford & Springfield Street Railway, now along the line of the Connecticut Trolley Museum)
 Playland (also known as Playland at the Beach), San Francisco, California (1927–1972)
 Ponce de Leon amusement park, Atlanta, Georgia
 Puritas Springs, Cleveland, Ohio 
 Riverhurst Park, Weston Mills, New York
 Riverside Amusement Park, Indianapolis, Indiana (1903–1970)
 Riverside Amusement Park, now Six Flags New England, Agawam, Massachusetts
 Rock City Park, Allegany, New York
 Rock Springs Park, Chester, West Virginia
 Rocky Glen Park, near Moosic, Pennsylvania (later became Ghost Town at the Glen before becoming New Rocky Glen)
 Ramona Park, East Grand Rapids, Michigan
 Savin Rock Amusement Park, West Haven, Connecticut (1870s–1966)
 Shady Grove Park, Uniontown, Pennsylvania
 Shellpot Park, near Wilmington, Delaware
 Suburban Gardens, Washington, D.C.
 Sutro Baths, San Francisco, California (1896–1966)
 Terrapin Park, Parkersburg, West Virginia
 Vanity Fair, East Providence, Rhode Island
 West View Park, West View, Pennsylvania
 Whalom Park, Lunenburg, Massachusetts
 White City, Atlanta, Georgia (1910–1925)
 White City, Indianapolis, Indiana (1906–1908)
 White City, Philadelphia, Pennsylvania (1898–1912)
 White City, Shrewsbury, Massachusetts
 Wildwood Amusement Park, Mahtomedi, Minnesota
 Willow Grove Park, Willow Grove, Pennsylvania (1896–1976; now the Willow Grove Park Mall, but still has a carousel inside the shopping mall.)
 Wonderland Amusement Park, Indianapolis, Indiana (1906–1911)
  Wonderland Amusement Park, Revere, Massachusetts (1906–1910)
 Wonderland Amusement Park, Minneapolis, Minnesota (1905–1911)

See also
 Oregon Electric Railway Museum—a trolley museum that, at its original location, was called the "Trolley Park"

References

External links
 

Amusement parks in the United States
Streetcars in the United States